Snow White is a silent movie made in 1902.  It was the first time the classic 1812 Brothers Grimm fairy tale was made into a film. It was registered for United States copyright on May 1, 1903.

References

External links

American silent short films
American black-and-white films
1902 films
Films based on Snow White
1900s American films
Silent horror films